The 2010–11 St. Louis Blues season was the team's 44th season for the National Hockey League franchise that was established on June 5, 1967.

The Blues posted a regular season record of 38 wins, 33 losses and 11 overtime/shootout losses for 87 points, failing to qualify for the Stanley Cup playoffs for the second consecutive season. Until the 2017–18 NHL season, this was the final season that the Blues did not make the playoffs.

Off-season 
On April 14, the Blues announced that Davis Payne would be retained as head coach, making him the 23rd head coach of the franchise. 
Doug Armstrong was named the new general manager, replacing Larry Pleau, who will serve in a different capacity in the organization. On June 1, former player Scott Mellanby was hired as an assistant coach. On June 18, the Blues hired former NHL goaltender Corey Hirsch as their new goaltending coach. He joined the Blues on July 1.

On July 1, Doug Armstrong became the team's new general manager. Also on July 1, Dave Taylor became the new director of player personnel. He was previously with the Dallas Stars for three years and prior to that with the Los Angeles Kings organization as both a player and in their front office for 30 years.

On August 12, Dr. Jerome Gilden, the Blues' team doctor since their inception in 1967, died.

On August 27, forward Paul Kariya (a free agent at the time) announced that he would sit out the entire 2010–11 season due to post-concussion syndrome.

Divisional standings

Conference standings

Schedule and results

Pre-season

Schedule and results 
Blues Schedule 
On FSN, unless noted otherwise on VS.

 Green background  indicates win (2 points).
 Red background  indicates regulation loss (0 points).
 White background  indicates overtime/shootout loss (1 point).

Season

November 
T. J. Oshie broke his ankle in Columbus on November 10 during a fight midway in the third period playing the Columbus Blue Jackets when a Blue Jacket player fell on him; he will be out at least three months. He had surgery the next day. Just before that game, after a November 7 shutout (game #4) win, the Blues were off to their best start in team history, with seven consecutive wins for 20 points (9–1–2) in only 12 games.

Ratings have soared for the Blues on FSN with 16 telecasts averaging 3.6, a whopping 59% higher than the 2.3 rating compared to the same time last year. October was the best-season opening month in Blues' history for games on the network. A record 5.6 rating was achieved on November 4 (Blues at home against the San Jose Sharks) beating the 5.0 rating for a game on March 29, 2000. The team has also sold out each one of its nine home games so far with 19,150 per game, for a total of 172,350.

December 
The slew of key injuries this season continued with the concussion that Andy McDonald received on the last play of the December 4 game against the Edmonton Oilers in an overtime loss. He is the fourth Blue to suffer the debilitating injury with Cam Janssen and Carlo Colaiacovo returning, but David Perron still out with his since November 4.

T. J. Oshie began a light skate on December 23, six weeks after suffering a broken ankle on November 10, and could return by the end of January.

January 
David Backes was named the lone Blues' representative for the NHL All-Star Game for January 30, his first.

T. J. Oshie was activated and available for the game on January 18 after missing 31 games since a broken ankle on November 10.

On January 20, the Blues updated the status of two forwards with concussions: Andy McDonald and David Perron. McDonald passed a baseline concussion test and has resumed light skating. He has been out of the lineup since December 4. Perron is still experiencing symptoms but will begin light exercise to see how his body responds. He has been out of the lineup since November 4.

February 
On February 1, the Blues announced that the day's home game against the Colorado Avalanche was postponed due to severe weather. No make-up date has been set.

On February 2, the Blues announced that February 22 at 7pm is to be the make-up date for the February 1 postponed game.

Andy McDonald has been activated from injured reserve and will play against the Edmonton Oilers on February 4. He has missed 24 games since his December 4 concussion. To make room for him, the Blues sent Philip McRae down to the American Hockey League's Peoria Rivermen.

On February 18, the Blues traded their captain, Eric Brewer to the Tampa Bay Lightning in exchange for unsigned draft choice Brock Beukeboom and a third-round pick in the upcoming 2011 NHL Entry Draft.

On a second consecutive day of trading, the Blues traded Erik Johnson, Jay McClement and a 2011 or 2012 first-round draft choice to the Colorado Avalanche in exchange for former first-round draft choices Chris Stewart, Kevin Shattenkirk and a conditional 2011 or 2012 second-round draft choice.

The team responded to the changes in the next game that same February 19 evening. After spotting the Anaheim Ducks an 0–2 deficit, they scored two quick goals to tie the game, and then two others in the first period for a slender 4–3 lead. They then blasted four more goals in the second period, including two consecutive goals late in the period by newcomer Chris Stewart (with Kevin Shattenkirk setting him up for his second goal), and one more in the third in a runaway 9–3 win. It was the highest number of goals scored by the Blues in a single game since they scored their all-time high of 11 against the Ottawa Senators in 1994.

David Perron has been trying to get back onto the ice since his November 4 concussion. He has missed 50 games (through game #60 on February 24). He passed a baseline test last month and has begun light exercises.

Ben Bishop recorded his first NHL shutout against the Edmonton Oilers, stopping all 39 shots in a 5–0 win in Edmonton on February 25.

In the third major trade in barely over a week, on February 27, the Blues traded Brad Boyes to the Buffalo Sabres for a second-round draft pick.

The Blues suffered a rare shutout at the Buffalo game after 111 consecutive games, the longest in the NHL and only eight games shy of the Blues' record.

The Blues on February 28, the Blues placed goaltender Ty Conklin on waivers, but he cleared them with no team picking him up, so he remains a Blue for now. The team can either send him to the Peoria Rivermen, or ask goaltender Ben Bishop to be demoted.

In a move just before the NHL trade deadline at 3pm EST, on February 28, the Blues traded left-winger Brad Winchester for a third-round draft pick from the Anaheim Ducks in 2012.

March 
After a glittering 9–1–2 (20 points in 12 games) start, the Blues plagued by injuries and sub-par performances by key personnel, dropped to an even record (28–28–9) with a loss to the New York Islanders on March 5. They have since struggled to a 19–27–7 (45 points in 53 games) record after that November 7 high point.

Prior to the March 7 game, a 5–4 shootout win against the Columbus Blue Jackets, the team honored its four greatest players to wear the number 7 jersey in a "Salute to No. 7": Red Berenson, Garry Unger, Joe Mullen, and Keith Tkachuk. Transcripts of the four speeches are here.

Defenseman Barret Jackman and forward Alexander Steen (both alternate captains), will miss four-to-six weeks due to injuries suffered in the overtime win on March 9. The team subsequently elevated 21-year-old, up-and-coming defenseman Alex Pietrangelo and veteran Andy McDonald to alternate captains.

On March 16, Chairman Dave Checketts announced he was putting up for sale his 20% stake in the franchise and the Scottrade Center. TowerBrook Capital Partners owns 70% and other minority investors (including a local beer distributor Tom Stillman) own the other 10%.
On March 17, it was announced that both the St. Louis Blues franchise and the Scottrade Center were for sale.

On March 30, the Blues defeated the Detroit Red Wings 10–3 at Joe Louis Arena. It was the first time an NHL team had scored 10 goals in a regular season game since February 6, 2009, when the Dallas Stars defeated the New York Rangers at home by a score of 10–2. It was also the first time that the Blues had scored 10 goals in a regular-season game since February 26, 1994, when they defeated the Ottawa Senators in an 11–1 road win.

April 
On April 1, the Blues were officially eliminated from the playoffs with a 3–2 loss to the Calgary Flames with a record of 35–33–10 (80 points) and four games to play. Calgary now has 89 points while the Blues can now only get to 88 points. Jarome Iginla got two goals plus an assist in the win to become the 77th player to reach 1,000 points in his career with the game-winning wrist shot on a breakaway with only 5:03 remaining in the third period. He has 39 goals and 41 assists in 79 games this season, and 480 goals plus 520 assists in 1,103 career regular-season games.

On April 9, David Backes earned a plus-minus team-high of +32, Alexander Steen scored his 20th goal with 49 seconds remaining in the game – which was also his 100th career NHL goal – and T. J. Oshie scored the first goal in a 2–0 shutout by Jaroslav Halak for the third time this season over the Nashville Predators.

The Blues finished in fourth place in the Central Division and 11th place in the Western Conference with a 38–33–11 (87 points) record.

The Blues concluded the regular season having allowed the fewest shorthanded goals in the NHL, with just one.

Playoffs 
The Blues failed to qualify for the playoffs again after having failed to qualify in 2009–10.

Player statistics

Skaters 
(Updated through games of April 9, 2011) FINAL 

Stats

Note: GP = Games played; G = Goals; A = Assists; Pts = Points; +/− = Plus/minus; PIM = Penalty minutes

* indicates not currently on the active roster. 
+ indicates on Injured Reserve. 
Stats reflect time with Blues only. 
Stats reflect time with Blues only.
Bold = leading team in category.

Goaltenders 
(Updated through games of April 9, 2011, FINAL) 

Stats

Note: GP = Games played; TOI = Time on ice (minutes); W = Wins; L = Losses; OT = Overtime losses; GA = Goals against; GAA= Goals against average; SA= Shots against; SV= Saves; Sv% = Save percentage; SO= Shutouts

Awards and records

Awards

Milestones

Transactions 

The Blues have been involved in the following transactions during the 2010–11 season.

Trades

Notes

Free agents acquired

Free agents lost

Claimed via waivers

Lost via waivers

Lost via retirement

Players signings

Draft picks 

St. Louis's picks at the 2010 NHL Entry Draft in Los Angeles, June 25–26, 2010. The Blues had the 14th choice by virtue of finishing ninth in the conference in 2009–10.

Farm teams

Peoria Rivermen 

The Peoria Rivermen are the Blues American Hockey League affiliate in 2010–11.

Alaska Aces 

The Alaska Aces are the Blues affiliate in the ECHL.

See also 

 2010–11 NHL season
 St. Louis Blues seasons
 St. Louis (sports)

References

External links 
 2010–11 St. Louis Blues season at ESPN
 2010–11 St. Louis Blues season at Hockey Reference

St. Louis Blues seasons
S
S
St Louis
St Louis